Zaryan is a name meaning finder of wealth that could be both of money and knowledge. Notable people with the surname include:

Aga Zaryan (born 1976), Polish singer
Kostan Zaryan (1885-1969), Armenian writer
Ruben Zaryan (1909-1994), Armenian theater specialist
Vahram Zaryan, French mime
The name can also take on different meanings depending on ethnic origin, pronunciation and spelling used, for example Zryan/Zaryan is also a name of Kurdish/Turkish origin with connotations suggesting a strong, powerful storm like intensity.